The Route of the Agroindustry and the Architecture Victoriana is located in the central part of Guatemala. The site is being considered for inclusion in the World Heritage list of sites with "outstanding universal value" to the world.

Site description
The route is typified by the various "rail stations, buildings of offices, hotels and built residences" of the late 19th and early 20th centuries, according to UNESCO.

World Heritage Status
This site was added to the UNESCO World Heritage Tentative List on September 23, 2002 in the Cultural category.

Notes

References
Route of the Agroindustry and the Architecture Victoriana - UNESCO World Heritage Centre Retrieved 2009-03-04.

Guatemalan culture